Renee Louise Ellmers ( Jacisin; born February 9, 1964) is an American registered nurse and politician who was the U.S. representative for  from 2011 to 2017. She is a member of the Republican Party. Ellmers defeated seven-term Democratic incumbent Bob Etheridge in 2010 by 1,489 votes, confirmed after a recount. In the 2016 Republican primary, Ellmers was defeated by fellow U.S. Representative George Holding. She ran unsuccessfully  in the 2022 election in North Carolina's 13th congressional district, finishing fifth in the primary field.

Early life, education, and nursing career

Ellmers was born Renee Louise Jacisin in Ironwood, Michigan, the daughter of Caroline Pauline (née Marshalek) and LeRoy Francis Jacisin. Her father was of Czech and French-Canadian descent and her mother was of Croatian and Polish ancestry. She moved to Madison Heights as a child, when her father got a job in the automobile industry. She graduated from Madison High School. Ellmers paid her way through Oakland University by working various jobs, training as a medical assistant. In 1990, she graduated with a Bachelor of Science in Nursing. Ellmers worked as a nurse in Beaumont Hospital's surgical intensive care unit. In North Carolina, she was clinical director of the Trinity Wound Care Center in Dunn.

U.S. House of Representatives

Elections

2010 

Ellmers became involved in politics after the passage of the Patient Protection and Affordable Care Act, which she opposed. She became involved in local Republican politics and joined Americans for Prosperity, a free-market political advocacy group. She sought the Republican Party nomination for Congress in North Carolina's 2nd congressional district, which was then held by seven-term incumbent Bob Etheridge. She faced car dealer Todd Gailas and retired businessman Frank Deatrich in the May 4, 2010 Republican primary. She raised and spent more money than her opponents. She won the Republican primary with 55% of the vote, winning every county in the district except Franklin.

In June, a physical altercation between U.S. Congressman Bob Etheridge and two young men claiming to be students working on a project was posted to the internet. The previously obscure Ellmers was highlighted by conservative blogs such as RedState and the National Review's The Corner. Donations increased markedly, and a SurveyUSA poll showed Ellmers ahead by one percent. Ellmers received an endorsement from former Governor of Alaska Sarah Palin on August 18 through Facebook, citing Ellmers' experience in the health care industry. Palin endorsed Ellmers along with three other women, on the 90th anniversary of women's suffrage in the United States.

On election day, November 2, 2010, Ellmers was declared the winner by the media and a recount conducted on November 17 and 18 confirmed that she defeated Bob Etheridge during the general election by a margin of 0.8% or 1,483 votes.

2012 

The Republicans won control of the General Assembly in the 2010 election as well, and used the redistricting process to make the 2nd friendlier for Ellmers. They pushed the district well to the west to take in some heavily Republican territory between Raleigh and Greensboro. The two sections were connected by a narrow tendril sweeping from Fayetteville through Ellmers' home in Dunn to Raleigh. While Barack Obama won the old 2nd with 52 percent of the vote—one of the few majority-white districts in the south that went for Obama—John McCain would have carried the new 2nd with 57 percent of the vote.

Three Republicans decided to challenge her in the primary, but all of them were first-time candidates. She won the May 8 primary with 56% of the vote. In the November general election, Ellmers defeated Democratic nominee Steve Wilkins, a retired US Army officer and Moore County businessman, 56%–41%.

2014 

Ellmers considered running for the U.S. Senate in 2014, but instead ran for re-election. In May 2014 primary she faced conservative Internet talk show host Frank Roche, who campaigned mainly against her support of immigration reform. Ellmers easily won the nomination, capturing 58% of the vote to Roche's 41%. "American Idol" runner-up Clay Aiken won the Democratic nomination after a close primary. Ellmers secured the seat again with a margin of 36,649 votes from Second District voters.

2016 

A court-ordered redistricting made the 2nd significantly more compact. It lost much of its territory near Greensboro, and now took in a large chunk of the area represented by the former 13th district, forcing Ellmers into a primary challenge with George Holding, whose former district number was moved to the Triad area of North Carolina.  Ellmers stated that Holding wasn't qualified to run in the district since he lived just outside its borders (though members of the House are only required to live in the state they represent). However, the new 2nd was geographically more Holding's district than Ellmers'. 
Ellmers had to contend with a high level of campaign spending by outside groups aligning themselves with the Tea Party movement, including Americans for Prosperity, which spent in the "low six figures" to defeat her. Conservative opposition to Ellmers arose from her push to prevent a vote on a 2015 abortion bill, from her votes on spending and budget bills, and from her vote in favor of the continuation of the Export-Import Bank. In the June 7th primary, she lost her primary campaign to Holding by an almost 30-point margin, coming in second by just 0.6% over third-place Greg Brannon.

Tenure
In September 2011, Ellmers told students at Campbell University that she opposed a state constitutional amendment banning same-sex marriage and civil unions because it was too broad. A spokesman said "Congresswoman Ellmers has always believed that marriage is a sacred institution and is defined as the union between one man and one woman...As a voter, she would vote against a piece of legislation that would add a ban on civil unions to the protection of marriage since they are two different issues and should be dealt with separately."

She supported the Budget Control Act of 2011 saying "It's not 100 percent of what many of our very conservative colleagues want, but it is about 70-75 percent. This is not about who's the most conservative. This is about common sense."

Ellmer served as the chairwoman of the Republican Women's Policy Committee.

In 2015, Ellmers—who identifies as pro-life—co-led a group of Republican women that advocated against holding a floor vote on the Pain-Capable Unborn Child Protection Act; the bill would ban abortions after 20 weeks' gestation. Ellmers reportedly "objected to a provision in the bill that would have required women seeking a rape or incest exemption to have reported those rapes to the authorities."

Committee assignments
 Committee on Energy and Commerce
 Subcommittee on Health
 Subcommittee on Oversight and Investigations
 Subcommittee on Communications and Technology

Caucus memberships
 Congressional Constitution Caucus

Post-congressional career
In May 2017, Ellmers began working for the United States Department of Health and Human Services as a regional director in Atlanta. She worked as a registered nurse during the COVID-19 pandemic in the United States.

Campaign for lieutenant governor
In 2020, Ellmers sought election as Lieutenant Governor of North Carolina. She placed fifth in the Republican primary election, with businessman Mark Robinson securing the nomination and eventually winning the general election.

Sponsored legislation

The White House Accountability Act
On March 26, 2015, Ellmers sponsored a bill called The White House Accountability Act (H.R.1693). She introduced the bill as her response to President Obama issuing an executive order to cease deportation of undocumented immigrants. The bill is aimed at funds Congress appropriated for White House salaries and expenses for fiscal year 2015. If passed, the bill would rescind any funds left that have not yet been spent.

Fairness for Farmers Act
On March 17, 2015, Ellmers sponsored the Fairness for Farmers Act of 2015. The bill would give an exemption to agricultural farming companies from the section of the Affordable Care Act that mandates health insurance coverage for employers that have more than 50 employees.

Vaccine Access, Certainty, and Innovation Act
On February 5, 2015, Ellmers introduced H.R. 786: Vaccine Access, Certainty, and Innovation Act of 2015. Democratic Congressman G.K. Butterfield cosponsored the bill. The trade association for biotechnology companies (the Biotechnology Industry Organization, "BIO") supported the bill. If passed into law, the bill would make the work conducted by the Advisory Committee on Immunization Practices (ACIP) more transparent and consistent toward the goal of developing recommendations for vaccines; create a formal process for the Centers for Disease Control to meet regularly with companies that make vaccines; and push Medicare to promptly pay for vaccines for senior citizens.

Personal life
Ellmers met her husband, Brent Ellmers, a surgeon, while working at Beaumont Hospital. After the birth of their son, the family moved to Dunn, North Carolina, where Ellmers and her husband ran a practice.

In October 2015, House Majority Leader Kevin McCarthy was accused of having an affair with Ellmers. He had unexpectedly dropped out of the race for Speaker of the House shortly before the allegations surfaced. Both McCarthy and Ellmers have denied the allegations.

Ellmers, a Roman Catholic, has said, "As a mom, Christian and nurse, my beliefs have deepened through experience... I am pro-family."

See also
 Women in the United States House of Representatives

References

External links

 
 
 
 

1964 births
21st-century American politicians
21st-century American women politicians
American nurses
American people of Croatian descent
American people of Czech descent
American people of French-Canadian descent
American politicians of Polish descent
American women nurses
Candidates in the 2022 United States House of Representatives elections
Catholics from Michigan
Catholics from North Carolina
Female members of the United States House of Representatives
Living people
Oakland University alumni
People from Dunn, North Carolina
People from Ironwood, Michigan
People from Madison Heights, Michigan
Republican Party members of the United States House of Representatives from North Carolina
United States Department of Health and Human Services officials
Women in North Carolina politics